St Augustine's RC High School is a coeducational Roman Catholic secondary school located in Billington, Lancashire, England.

History
The school opened in 1963 originally intaking 450 pupils. It is now the largest Roman Catholic high school in its LEA.

St Augustine's won the DfES School Achievement Award for both 2000–2001 and 2001–2002. It was the only high school in Lancashire to be awarded Beacon status in 2002. In 2003 it became one of the first Leading Edge Schools in England and one of Lancashire’s first three Specialist Science Colleges. In 2008, it achieved High Performing Specialist College status and was also awarded Specialist Languages College status.

Previously a voluntary aided school administered by Lancashire County Council, in December 2022 St Augustine's converted to academy status. The school is now sponsored by the Romero Catholic Academy Trust, but continues to be under the jurisdiction of the Roman Catholic Diocese of Salford.

Curriculum

Curriculum at KS3

Curriculum at KS4
Every student must take maths and English along with either Double Award Science, or separate sciences. These are allocated 3 slots per week. Although St Augustines is a specialist language college, learning a language is not obligatory. Pupils must select more courses in order to fill the time table. Each non-core subject takes up 2 periods per week on the time table.

Lessons
There are many different subjects taught at St Augustine's. In year 9, options are taken for pupils to choose their own subjects. All subjects are taken in years 7-9.
English - split into English language and English literature in year 10.
Mathematics
Science - in year 9 pupils can opt for 'triple science' (biology, chemistry and physics) or 'science' (a grouping of all three)
Modern foreign languages - split into French and Spanish.
Art
Resistant materials
Electronics
Textiles
Food technology
Graphic design
Music
Information computer technology (ICT)
History - splits into pre 20th century and 20th century at year 9
Geography
Drama
Religious education
Physical education
PHSE

At GCSE level, pupils can also have 'study periods', which are free periods to catch up on work.

Also year 8 now take options they choose one subject (music, drama, P.E and technology subjects) and all pupils must take one language (French or Spanish)

Attainment

Notable former pupils
David Dunn, footballer
Michael Bisping, professional mixed martial artist

References

External links
St Augustine's official website

Schools in Ribble Valley
Catholic secondary schools in the Diocese of Salford
Secondary schools in Lancashire
Educational institutions established in 1963
1963 establishments in England
Academies in Lancashire